Lurs can refer to:

 Lur, a long musical wind instrument without finger holes
 Lur, an Etruscan deity
 Lurs,  an Iranian ethnic group
 Lurs, Alpes-de-Haute-Provence, a commune of Alpes-de-Haute-Provence, France

See also
 Luri (disambiguation)
 Lari (disambiguation)